Robin Sharman (born 8 December 1979) is an English road racing cyclist and coach from Repton, Derbyshire. He competed in the Under-23 road races at the UCI Road World Championships in 2000 and 2001. He represented England at the 2006 Commonwealth Games, competing in the road event but did not finish the race. In February 2009 Sharman was appointed Olympic Development Programme Coach for the Great Britain junior squad, following a year as a coach for British Cycling's Go Ride scheme in the East Midlands.

Palmarès

2000
2nd British National Road Race Championships (Under 23)

2005
1st Overall Premier Calendar
2nd Stage 2, 2005 Tour of Britain

2006
1st East Midlands International Cicle Classic
2nd Overall Premier Calendar

2007
3rd Overall Premier Calendar

2011
4th Ryedale Grand Prix

References

1979 births
English male cyclists
Commonwealth Games competitors for England
Cyclists at the 2006 Commonwealth Games
People from Repton
Sportspeople from Derbyshire
Living people
English cycling coaches